Clearfield High School is a secondary school in Clearfield, Utah, United States. It is part of the Davis School District. The school's mascot is the peregrine falcon, and its colors are green and white with an accent of gold. In 1960-61 students opened the doors of the new Clearfield High School, with the first class graduating in spring 1963. The current principal is Chris Keime.

Athletics

Clearfield High participates in many sports. It has teams that compete in baseball, basketball, cross-country, football, golf, soccer, softball, swimming, track, tennis, volleyball, and wrestling. It also has an ROTC program that has multiple teams of its own, including a military drill team, a marksmanship team, a cyber defense team, and a robotics team.

Notable alumni
 Andre Dyson, defensive back (NFL)
 Kevin Dyson, wide receiver (NFL)
 Ken Gardner, retired professional basketball player
Brandon Mitchell, member of the Idaho House of Representatives
 Dallon Weekes, former member of Panic! at the Disco and frontman of the music duo I Don't Know How But They Found Me.

References

External links

Clearfield High School homepage

Public high schools in Utah
Schools in Davis County, Utah
International Baccalaureate schools in Utah
Buildings and structures in Davis County, Utah
Clearfield, Utah